The following is a list of monastic houses in Cambridgeshire, England.

The following locations in Cambridgeshire lack known monastic connections:
Barnwell Priory Abbey: (The Church of Saint Andrew-the-Less, Barnwell), built adjacent to former Priory Church, called 'The Abbey Church'
Buckden Abbey: Elizabethan mansion

See also
 List of monastic houses in England

Notes

References

Bibliography

History of Cambridgeshire
England in the High Middle Ages
Medieval sites in England
Archaeological sites in Cambridgeshire
Houses in Cambridgeshire
 
Cambridgeshire
Cambridgeshire
Lists of buildings and structures in Cambridgeshire